Boris Midney (born October 22, 1937) is a Soviet-born American musician, producer, composer and conductor.

Biography 
Midney was born in Moscow to a conductor and pianist father and classical singer mother. He studied classical composition and clarinet also teaching himself to play saxophone. 

In 1964 he defected from the USSR via the US embassy in Japan. Midney's main reason for leaving the USSR was the censorship of art. After arriving in New York, he formed The Russian Jazz Quartet with whom he recorded an album for Impulse Records. In the 1960s, Midney married Tania Armour from the Armour & Company family.

Later, Midney became a prolific composer and producer of disco music although he rarely was credited under his own name. Using guises such as USA-European Connection, Masquerade, Double Discovery, Companion and Festival, Midney produced a large body of disco music. He is recognised as being among the first producers to take full advantage of 48-track recording and one of the creators of the Eurodisco genre.

Describing his disco music, critics Alan Jones and Jussi Kantonen wrote:On the Mount Olympus of disco there are numerous gods but there is only one Zeus and his name is Boris Midney. He's the Stephen Sondheim, David Hockney and Stanley Kubric of the disco genre all rolled into one.In 1999 Midney released Trancetter, a progressive trance album.

Discography 

 Music From The Empire Strikes Back (RSO, 1980)
 Trancetter (Max Music & Entertainment Inc., 1999)

With The Russian Jazz Quartet

 Happiness (Impulse, 1964)
With Paul Levinson

 Twice Upon a Rhyme (HappySad Records, 1972)

As USA-European Connection

 Come Into My Heart (Marlin, 1978)
 USA-European Connection (Marlin, 1978)

As Beautiful Bend

 Make That Feeling Come Again! (Marlin, 1978)

As Festival

 Evita (RSO, 1979)

As Masquerade

 Pinocchio (Prelude, 1979)

As Caress

 Caress (Warner Bros., 1979)

As Companion

 Companion (Barclay, 1981)

References 

  

Living people
1937 births
Soviet defectors to the United States
American disco musicians
American jazz musicians
American record producers